Fredonia   is an unincorporated community and census-designated place in Chambers County, Alabama, United States. As of the 2010 census, its population was 199. Other names for the community have included "Freedona" and "Hursts Store". It is the location of the New Hope Rosenwald School, which is listed on the National Register of Historic Places.

Demographics

History
From its foundation, Fredonia was the educational and trade center for the northeast section of Chambers County. The town was incorporated September 29, 1853. Sixteen businesses existed including a jug factory, hotels, taverns, blacksmith shop, tan yard, the "Temperance House" as well as the first established Methodist Church in the county. The Southern Military was established in the village by the Alabama State Legislature, but it was forced to close by the Civil War.

Incorporation
In October 2008 the Chambers County Commission petitioned Probate Court to forfeit the charter of the Town of Fredonia. The Probate Court ordered that Fredonia's charter be forfeited. A majority of the people in the town decided that they wanted to reinstate the town and, in order to do so, would first have to reverse the forfeiture. A group called "Free Fredonia Community" was formed and fundraising begun, an attorney was hired and an appeal was filed to reverse the forfeiture. While waiting for the case to come before the court, an election happened, and a number of the new commissioners agreed that the forfeiture should be reversed. In July 2011 the Chambers County Commission voted to reverse the forfeiture. On July 26, 2011, the court returned Fredonia to the status it held before forfeiture.

References

Census-designated places in Alabama
Census-designated places in Chambers County, Alabama
Unincorporated communities in Alabama
Unincorporated communities in Chambers County, Alabama